Flonja Kodheli is an Albanian-born Belgian actress, musician, pianist and composer.

Early life
Kodheli was born in Tirana, Albania to parents who were both artists, as her mother Justina Aliaj was a well-known singer and actress and her father Pjerin Kodheli was a famous actor. Her brother Rubin is also associated with music and cinema being a composer for film and orchestra. The Kodheli family fled Albania in 1993 and settled in Belgium. Having played the piano since the age of eight, she pursued her studies at the Conservatoire Royal de Mons, where she received a first prize for piano and for chamber music. After finishing her studies at the Conservatoire, she became increasingly interested in acting, and attended various acting workshops in Brussels run by different Belgian filmmakers, in particular Frédéric Dumont, Yves Hanchar and Stephan Carpiaux. She attended a theatre workshop run by Boris Rabey, a professor at the Russian Academy of Theatre Arts, which led her to devote herself to acting, and she soon moved to Paris, France to pursue an acting career. In 2010, Kodheli played the sister of Ilir (Guillaume Gouix) in the film "A Sleepless Night" by David Lambert, where she also wrote and performed the original music in the film.

Besides her native Albanian, Kodheli is fluent in French, Italian and English, and has used these to her advantage in her acting career.

Filmography

References

Sources
 http://www.ungrandmoment.be/flonja-kodheli-entrevue/
 https://iloveitalianmovies.com/2016/07/02/italianmoviestreamingdvd/
 http://www.cine-woman.fr/flonja-kodheli/
 https://news.cinecitta.com/IT/it-it/news/54/63339/flonja-kodheli-conosco-la-durezza-di-lila.aspx
 http://flonjakodheli.com/article-standaard/

External links
 
 

Living people
Albanian actresses
21st-century Albanian actresses
Albanian film actresses
Albanian television actresses
21st-century Belgian actresses
Belgian film actresses
Belgian television actresses
Albanian emigrants to Belgium
People from Tirana
Year of birth missing (living people)